The Apostolic Vicariate of Savannakhet is a territorial jurisdiction of the Catholic Church in Laos. As an apostolic vicariate, it is a pre-diocesan jurisdiction, entitled to a titular bishop. It is located in central Laos.

It is exempt, i.e., not part of any ecclesiastical province and directly dependent on the Holy See and its missionary Roman Congregation for the Evangelization of Peoples.

The vicariate covers an area of 48,100 km² in central Laos, including the provinces of Savannakhet, Khammouan and part of Bolikhamxai. By land area, it is the largest of the apostolic vicariates in Laos. Approximately 12,500 of the 2.7 million people living within the vicariate are members of the Catholic Church. The vicariate has 54 parishes, and only 6 priests.

History
The Apostolic Vicariate of Savannakhet was originally established as the Prefecture Apostolic of Thakhek on 21 December 1950, when the Vicariate Apostolic of Laos was split into two parts. The western part in Thailand was renamed the Vicariate Apostolic of Thare, while the Laotian part was formed into a new prefecture. On 24 February 1958 it was elevated to an Apostolic Vicariate. In 1963 the name was changed to Savannakhet, even though its see remained in Thakhek, Khammouan province. In 1967 the southern part of the vicariate was erected as the independent Vicariate Apostolic of Paksé.

Ordinaries

Apostolic Vicars of Savannakhet
 Jean-Rosière-Eugène Arnaud, M.E.P. (1950-1969)
 Pierre-Antonio-Jean Bach, M.E.P. (1971-1975)
 Jean-Baptiste Outhay Thepmany (1975-1997)
 Jean Sommeng Vorachak (1997-2009)
 Jean Marie Vianney Prida Inthirath (2010-present)

References

External links
Catholic hierarchy 

Savannakhet
Savannakhet
Christian organizations established in 1950
Roman Catholic dioceses and prelatures established in the 20th century
1950 establishments in Laos
Savannakhet